The 2000 United States presidential election in Illinois took place on November 7, 2000, and was part of the 2000 United States presidential election. Voters chose 22 representatives, or electors to the Electoral College, who voted for president and vice president.

Illinois was easily won by sitting Vice President Al Gore of the State of Tennessee, unlike other states in the Midwest, such as nearby Iowa, Minnesota and Wisconsin, which Gore won, albeit by very small margins. George W. Bush, Republican of Texas, did not perform terribly at the county level, as he obtained less than forty percent of the vote in only three counties. Gore's key to victory was Cook County, home of Chicago, by far the most populous county in the state and one of the most populated counties in the nation. Gore won that county with almost seventy percent of the vote, his best performance in any county in the state. 

The election marked the first time since 1976 that Illinois did not vote for the winning presidential nominee and marked an end to Illinois’ status as a bellwhether state. Bush became the first Republican to win the White House without carrying Illinois; he also became the first Republican ever to win the White House without carrying Champaign, Peoria, or Whiteside Counties. This was also the first time since 1848 that a Democrat would carry Illinois without winning the presidency.  Illinois was 1 of 10 states that George W. H. Bush carried in his presidential win in 1988 that George W. Bush failed to carry in either of his runs for president.

Election information
The primaries and general elections coincided with those for congress and those for state offices.

Turnout

For the state-run primaries (Democratic and Republican), turnout was 22.92%, with 1,546,588 votes cast. For the general election, turnout was 66.52%, with 4,742,123 votes cast.

Primaries

Democratic

The 2000 Illinois Democratic presidential primary was held on March 21, 2000 in the U.S. state of Illinois as one of the Democratic Party's statewide nomination contests ahead of the 2000 presidential election.

161 of the state's 190 delegates were pledged delegates elected in the primary (the remaining 29 delegates were superdelegates). Of the 161 pledged delegates, 35 were elected based upon the statewide popular vote, with the remaining 126 being elected based upon congressional district popular votes. In order to receive delegates from either the popular vote of either the state at-large of the popular vote of a congressional district, a candidate needed to reach the threshold of 15% or more of said vote.

Republican

The 2000 Illinois Republican presidential primary was held on March 21, 2000 in the U.S. state of Illinois as one of the Republican Party's statewide nomination contests ahead of the 2000 presidential election.

Illinois assigned 60 directly-elected delegates (the state had another 10 delegates that were not directly elected by voters). The Illinois primary was a so-called "Loophole" primary. This meant that the statewide presidential preference vote was a "beauty contest", from which no delegates would be assigned. Instead, the delegates were assigned by separate direct-votes on delegate candidates (whose proclaimed presidential preferences were listed beside their names on the ballot). These delegates were noted voted on at-large by a state vote, but rather by congressional district votes. The number of delegates each congressional district would be able to elect had been decided based upon the strength of that district's vote for the Republican nominee (Bob Dole) in the previous 1996 election.

The remaining ten delegates not directly elected by congressional district were selected at the Illinois Republican Party Convention, and were unpledged delegates.

General election

Results by county

Counties that flipped from Democratic to Republican
Bond (Largest city: Greenville)
Bureau (Largest city: Princeton)
Cass (Largest city: Beardstown)
Christian (Largest city: Taylorville)
Clay (Largest city: Flora)
Clinton (Largest city: Breese)
Coles (Largest city: Charleston)
DeKalb (Largest city: DeKalb)
Fayette (Largest city: Vandalia)
Greene (Largest city: Carrollton)
Grundy (Largest city: Morris)
Hamilton (Largest city: McLeansboro)
Hancock (Largest city: Hamilton)
Hardin (Largest city: Rosiclare)
Jefferson (Largest city: Mount Vernon)
Jersey (Largest city: Jerseyville)
Jo Daviess (Largest city: Galena)
Kankakee (Largest city: Kankakee)
Lake (Largest city: Waukegan)
Lawrence (Largest city: Lawrenceville)
Marion (Largest city: Centralia)
Marshall (Largest city: Henry)
Mason (Largest city: Havana)
Massac (Largest city: Metropolis)
McDonough (Largest city: Macomb)
Moultrie (Largest city: Sullivan)
Piatt (Largest city: Monticello)
Pike (Largest city: Pittsfield)
Pope (Largest city: Golconda)
Randolph (Largest city: Chester)
Saline (Largest city: Harrisburg)
Schuyler (Largest city: Rushville)
Shelby (Largest city: Shelbyville)
Union (Largest city: Anna)
Vermilion (Largest city: Danville)
Warren (Largest city: Monmouth)
White (Largest city: Carmi)
Will (Largest city: Joliet)
Williamson (Largest city: Marion)
Winnebago (Largest city: Rockford)

By congressional district
Gore won 11 of 20 congressional districts, including two that elected Republicans.

Analysis
Vice President Al Gore easily defeated Texas Governor George W. Bush in the “Land of Lincoln”. Illinois was once reckoned as a swing state or slightly Republican-leaning, but, since Bill Clinton's election in 1992, it swung heavily for the Democrats at the presidential level, remaining heavily Democratic in 1996. The blue trend can chiefly be traced to the explosive increase in the Democratic margins in Cook County, which encompasses Chicago and its inner suburbs and is the second-largest county in the country. In 1996, Bill Clinton reached 66.8% of the vote in Cook County, a level exceeding any nominee's in the county since Warren G. Harding in 1920, and Gore improved on Clinton's vote share in the county still further.

Secondarily, although Bush still retained the famously Republican Chicago collar counties, he underperformed recent competitive Republicans in them. He won DuPage County, the largest collar county, by only 13.3%, as compared to Gerald Ford's 40.5% margin in the county in 1976, and his father's 39.4% margin in 1988 (in both of which cases DuPage County provided the Republican's entire statewide margin).

Bush did do well in much of rural Illinois, although Gore retained a number of counties in the Forgottonia region that had begun going Democratic in 1988. Gore also did well in Metro East, whereas Bush held moderately-populated Sangamon County (Springfield) and McLean County (Bloomington). Ultimately, Gore's overwhelming strength in Cook County was decisive in handing Gore a more than five hundred thousand vote (or 12%) advantage in the state, which was among the first Midwestern states to be called on election night.

, this is the last election in which Franklin County and Perry County voted for a Democratic presidential candidate.

Electors

Technically the voters of Illinois cast their ballots for electors: representatives to the Electoral College. For this election, Illinois is allocated 22 electors because it has 20 congressional districts and two senators. All candidates who appear on the ballot or qualify to receive write-in votes must submit a list of 22 electors, who pledge to vote for their candidate and his or her running mate. Whoever wins the majority of votes in the state is awarded all 22 electoral votes. Their chosen electors then vote for president and vice president. Although electors are pledged to their candidate and running mate, they are not obligated to vote for them. An elector who votes for someone other than his or her candidate is known as a faithless elector.

The electors of each state and the District of Columbia met on December 18, 2000 to cast their votes for president and vice president. The Electoral College itself never meets as one body. Instead the electors from each state and the District of Columbia met in their respective capitols.

The following were the members of the Electoral College from the state. All were pledged to and voted for Gore and Lieberman:
Joan Brennan
Dave Bybee
Vilma Colom
Barbara Flynn Currie
John P. Daley
Vera Davis
James DeLeo
Marge Friedman
Charles A. Hartke
Tinker Harvey
Carolyn Brown Hodge
Constance A. Howard
Mary Lou Kearns
Michael J. Madigan
William Marovitz
Shirley McCombs
Molly McKenzie
Victory McNamara
John Nelson
Donald Pedro
Dan Pierce
Jerry Sinclair

See also
 United States presidential elections in Illinois

References

 

2000
Illinois
2000 Illinois elections